Walter Jones may refer to:

Politicians
 Walter Jones (Virginia politician) (1745–1815), American Representative from Virginia from 1797–1799, and 1803–1811
 Walter Jones (Irish politician) (1754–1839), MP for Coleraine 1798–1800, 1801–06 and 1807–09
 Walter Jones (Australian politician) (1885–1924), Australian politician
 Walter Burgwyn Jones (1888–1963), American legislator, writer, and judge
 Walter H. Jones (New Jersey politician) (1912–1982), American Republican Party politician
 Walter B. Jones Sr. (1913–1992), US Representative from North Carolina, 1965–1992
 Walter B. Jones Jr. (1943–2019), US Representative from North Carolina, 1995–2019

Sports
 Walter Jones (polo) (1866–1932), British polo competitor at the 1908 Summer Olympics
 Walter Jones (Northern Irish footballer) (1925–2020), Northern Irish professional footballer
 Walter Jones (sailor) (1926–2007), Bermudian sailor
 Wali Jones (born 1942), American former basketball player
 Walter Jones (American football) (born 1974), American former football player

Others
 Walter Dally Jones (1855–1926), British soldier
 Walter Jennings Jones (1865–1935), American biochemist
 Walter Newton Jones (1874–1922), American stage and film actor
 Sir Walter Jones, 2nd Baronet (1880–1967), British industrialist
 Walter B. Jones (geologist) (1895–1977), American geologist and archaeologist
 Walter H. Jones (bishop) (1928–2003), American Episcopal bishop
 Walter Emanuel Jones (born 1970), American actor who played the Black Ranger in the Mighty Morphin Power Rangers
 Walter Jones (priest) (died 1577), Welsh Anglican priest
 Walter Jones, a character in Reviving Ophelia

See also
Wally Jones (disambiguation)